Mr. Boston, previously Old Mr. Boston, was a distillery located at 1010 Massachusetts Avenue in Boston, Massachusetts, from 1933 to 1986. It produced its own label of gin, bourbon, rum, and brandies, as well as a few cordials and liqueurs.

History
The distillery was founded in the Roxbury, Massachusetts, neighborhood of Boston in 1933 by Irwin "Red" Benjamin and Hyman C. Berkowitz.  Old Mister Boston was known for its collectible bottles such as the 1953 Presidential Inaugural Bottle.  

Over time, through a series of changes of ownership, the words "Old" and "Mr." were dropped from the name until it was known simply as "Boston".  
The distillery was a major employer in the Boston area from the 1930s until its closing circa 1986 when the parent company, Glenmore Distillers, shut down operations and the brand was withdrawn from the market. The building that housed Old Mr. Boston's operations is owned by the City of Boston and is in use as a City Inspectional Services headquarters as well as housing other city agencies such as the Boston Public Health Commission and the Department of Transitional Assistance.

Famous "Bartender's Guide"

The "Mr. Boston" name is known not only for its brands of distilled spirits, but also for its unique reference book, Mr. Boston Official Bartender's Guide, used by both professional and home bartenders as the "Bible of Booze".  The Guide was first published 1935, according to the first date published in the Guide's publisher information page, the early days after the Repeal of Prohibition, when the distillery started up business again.  As late as 2012 new editions were printed. In July 2016, Mr. Boston launched its new website, mrbostondrinks.com, where thirteen of the Official Bartender's Guides are available in digital form. It contains over 10,500 cocktail recipes.

1995 acquisition
The Barton Brands liquor unit of New York's Canandaigua Wine Co. (now Constellation Brands) acquired the brand name in 1995 and resumed production. Barton uses the brand for a line of liqueurs and cordials.  In 2009 Constellation Spirits, including the Mr. Boston brand, was sold to the Sazerac Company of New Orleans, which has subsequently released light and dark rums imported from the U.S. Virgin Islands under the Mr. Boston name.

2009 acquisition 
The Sazerac Company bought the Mr. Boston brand in 2009 and began putting many of the editions of the Bartender's Guide as the company could find on a website, which was at last count 58 out of the 75 guides published.

Mark Brown, president and chief executive officer, the Sazerac Company, said "The Mr. Boston books have covered the evolution of the cocktail in America since Prohibition, but sadly, they were let go over the years. The ties between our company and that brand are inextricably linked, with not only the Sazerac Cocktail, but our heritage in New Orleans, a city long synonymous with the cocktail culture.  It was a natural fit to bring it all together where we are ensuring the future of the brand for at least another 80 years as the 'go to' site for professional and amateur mixologists."

In addition to the Bartender's Guides, the Mr. Boston Company currently produces 47 liqueurs, liquors, and ready-mixed cocktails.

Famous Mr. Boston Brands 
 Rock & Rye
 Mint & Gin
 100 proof Vodka

References

External links
 "Ten Greatest Alcohol Icons of All Time - The Story Behind the Face on the Bottle" by Frank Kelly Rich, Modern Drunkard Magazine.com
 "Mr. Boston Must Not Die" by Wayne Curtis, PUNCHdrink.com 
 "Mr. Boston Official Bartender's Guide Joins the Digital Era" by Nino Marchetti, The Whiskey Wash.com 
 "Mr. Boston's bartending guide re-launched online by the Sazerac Company" by Todd A. Price, NOLA.com

Whiskies of the United States
Food and drink companies disestablished in 1986
Mr. Boston
Food and drink companies established in 1933
1933 establishments in Massachusetts
1986 disestablishments in Massachusetts